Technophobia (from Greek τέχνη technē, "art, skill, craft" and φόβος phobos, "fear"), also known as technofear, is the fear or dislike of advanced technology or complex devices, especially computers. Although there are numerous interpretations of technophobia, they become more complex as technology continues to evolve. The term is generally used in the sense of an irrational fear, but others contend fears are justified. It is the opposite of technophilia.

Larry Rosen, a research psychologist, computer educator, and professor at California State University, Dominguez Hills, suggests that there are three dominant subcategories of technophobes – the "uncomfortable users", the "cognitive computerphobes", and "anxious computerphobes". First receiving widespread notice during the Industrial Revolution, technophobia has been observed to affect various societies and communities throughout the world. This has caused some groups to take stances against some modern technological developments in order to preserve their ideologies. In some of these cases, the new technologies conflict with established beliefs, such as the personal values of simplicity and modest lifestyles.

Examples of technophobic ideas can be found in multiple forms of art, ranging from literary works such as Frankenstein to films like Metropolis. Many of these works portray a darker side to technology, as perceived by those who are technophobic. As technologies become increasingly complex and difficult to understand, people are more likely to harbor anxieties relating to their use of modern technologies.

Prevalence
A study published in the journal Computers in Human Behavior was conducted between 1992 and 1994 surveying first-year college students across various countries. The overall percentage of the 3,392 students who responded with high-level technophobic fears was 29%. In comparison, Japan had 58% high-level technophobes and Mexico had 53%.

A published report in 2000 stated that roughly 85–90% of new employees at an organization may be uncomfortable with new technology, and are technophobic to some degree.

History

Technophobia began to gain attention as a movement in England with the dawn of the Industrial Revolution. With the development of new machines able to do the work of skilled craftsmen using unskilled, low-wage labor, those who worked a trade began to fear for their livelihoods. In 1675, a group of weavers destroyed machines that replaced their jobs. By 1727, the destruction had become so prevalent that Parliament made the demolition of machines a capital offense. This action, however, did not stop the tide of violence. The Luddites, a group of anti-technology workers, united under the name "Ludd" in March 1811, removing key components from knitting frames, raiding houses for supplies, and petitioning for trade rights while threatening greater violence. Poor harvests and food riots lent aid to their cause by creating a restless and agitated population for them to draw supporters from.

The 19th century was also the beginning of modern science, with the work of Louis Pasteur, Charles Darwin, Gregor Mendel, Michael Faraday, Henri Becquerel, and Marie Curie, and inventors such as Nikola Tesla, Thomas Edison and Alexander Graham Bell. The world was changing rapidly, too rapidly for many, who feared the changes taking place and longed for a simpler time. The Romantic movement exemplified these feelings. Romantics tended to believe in imagination over reason, the "organic" over the mechanical, and a longing for a simpler, more pastoral time. Poets like William Wordsworth and William Blake believed that the technological changes that were taking place as a part of the industrial revolution were polluting their cherished view of nature as being perfect and pure.

After World War II, a fear of technology continued to grow, catalyzed by the bombings of Hiroshima and Nagasaki. With nuclear proliferation and the Cold War, people began to wonder what would become of the world now that humanity had the power to manipulate it to the point of destruction. Corporate production of war technologies such as napalm, explosives, and gases during the Vietnam War further undermined public confidence in technology's worth and purpose. In the post-WWII era, environmentalism also took off as a movement. The first international air pollution conference was held in 1955, and in the 1960s, investigations into the lead content of gasoline sparked outrage among environmentalists. In the 1980s, the depletion of the ozone layer and the threat of global warming began to be taken more seriously.

Luddites

Several societal groups are considered technophobic, the most recognisable of which are the Luddites. Many technophobic groups revolt against modern technology because of their beliefs that these technologies are threatening their ways of life and livelihoods. The Luddites were a social movement of British artisans in the 19th century who organized in opposition to technological advances in the textile industry. These advances replaced many skilled textile artisans with comparatively unskilled machine operators. The 19th century British Luddites rejected new technologies that impacted the structure of their established trades, or the general nature of the work itself.

Resistance to new technologies did not occur when the newly adopted technology aided the work process without making significant changes to it. The British Luddites protested the application of the machines, rather than the invention of the machine itself. They argued that their labor was a crucial part of the economy, and considered the skills they possessed to complete their labor as property that needed protection from the destruction caused by the autonomy of machines.

Use of modern technologies among Old Order Anabaptists

Groups considered by some people to be technophobic are the Amish and other Old Order Anabaptists. The Amish follow a set of moral codes outlined in the Ordnung, which rejects the use of certain forms of technology for personal use. Donald B. Kraybill, Karen M. Johnson-Weiner and Steven M. Nolt state in their book The Amish: 

What the Amish do, is selective use of modern technologies in order to maintain their belief and culture.

Technophobia in arts

An early example of technophobia in fiction and popular culture is Mary Shelley's Frankenstein. It has been a staple of science fiction ever since, exemplified by movies like Fritz Lang's Metropolis, which offer examples of how technophobia can occur, and Charlie Chaplin's Modern Times, in which people are reduced to nothing but cogs in the machinery, a product of new industrial techniques like the assembly line. This persisted through the 1960s, with the fears of nuclear weapons and radiation leading to giant insects in monster movies, cautionary tales like The Day the Earth Stood Still, and The Hulk. This was joined by fears of superintelligent machines, and rebellion amongst them, which was a recurring theme of Star Trek, from the original series to Star Trek: The Next Generation to Star Trek: Voyager in the 1990s.

A 1960 episode of The Twilight Zone called "A Thing About Machines" deals with a man's hatred for modern things such as electric razors, televisions, electric typewriters and clocks.

The 1971 film The Omega Man (loosely based on the Richard Matheson novel I am Legend) showed a world scarred by biological warfare and only a handful of humans and a cult of mutants remain alive. Charlton Heston's character is a scientist who is being targeted by the mutants who wish to destroy all science and machinery due to their technophobic beliefs. Technophobia is also thematic in Walter M. Miller's novel A Canticle for Leibowitz, in which nuclear war produces an attempt to stamp out science itself, which is held to be responsible.

In the 1970s, films such as Colossus: The Forbin Project and Demon Seed offered samples of domination by computers. The film Westworld, released in 1973, revolves around world of entertainment humanoids going completely wrong when they turn against humans. Also in the 1970s, Rich Buckler created Deathlok, a cyborg revivified by a madman as a slave killing machine, a dark twist on Frankenstein.

Technophobia achieved commercial success in the 1980s with the movie The Terminator, in which a computer becomes self-aware, and decides to kill all humans. Blade Runner shows us how human replicas were able to live on Earth, portraying technology gone wrong in "replicants" unhappy with their man-made limitations which demand they be "modified". Star Trek: Voyager introduced another twist, when "surplus" EMHs, such sophisticated expert systems as to be almost indistinguishable from human, being effectively reduced to slavery, while other, similar systems were turned into sentient prey. In the PC game Wing Commander: Privateer, a fanatical quasi-religious group, called the Retros, wishes to overthrow all forms of technology, even if doing so, they themselves have to use it in order to fulfill their goal. They play a central role in the Righteous Fire expansion game, wherein a new mysterious leader leads the group in an attempt to destroy all non-adherents of their religion.

Since then, there have been movies like I, Robot, The Matrix Trilogy, WALL-E, and the Terminator sequels. Shows such as Doctor Who have tackled the issue of technophobia – most specifically in the episode "The Robots of Death", with a character displaying a great fear of robots due to their lack of body language, described by the Fourth Doctor as giving them the appearance of "dead men walking". Series consultant Kit Pedler also used this fear as a basis for the inspiration of classic Doctor Who monsters the Cybermen, with the creatures being inspired by his own fear of artificial limbs becoming so common that it would become impossible to know when someone had stopped being a man and become simply a machine. Virtuosity speaks of a virtual serial killer who manages to escape to the real world. He goes on a rampage before he is inevitably stopped. This is a true technophobic movie in that its main plot is about technology gone wrong. It introduces a killer who blatantly destroys people.

Godfrey Reggio's Qatsi trilogy also deals heavily with issues of technophobia. The idea of keeping the "thinkers" and "workers" separate shows us that even the people who embraced technology feared the potential of it in some way.

Avatar is exemplary of technology's hold on humans who are empowered by it and visually demonstrates the amount of terror it instills upon those native to the concept. It enforces the notion that foreign creatures from Pandora are not only frightened by technology, but it is something they loathe; its potential to cause destruction could exceed their very existence. In contrast, the film itself used advanced technology such as the stereoscope in order to give viewers the illusion of physically taking part in an experience that would introduce them to a civilization struggling with technophobia.

The 2009 animated film 9 opens with the line, "We had such potential, such promise; but we squandered our gifts, our intelligence. Our blind pursuit of technology only sped us quicker to our doom. Our world is ending."

Attitutes of technophobia, however, seem to be changing. In the 2021 movie The Mitchells vs. the Machines, which depicts a robot uprising caused by an AI, the AI was not inherently malicious but rather turned bitter after its creator discarded it for a newer device; even then, the film has still been derided as the epitome of Luddism.

See also

 Anarcho-primitivism
 Anti-consumerism
 Antiscience
 Chemophobia
 "Darwin among the Machines" 
 Dystopia
 Digital phobic
 Erewhon
 List of phobias
 Minimalism in philosophy
 Neo-Luddism
 NIMBY
 Radical environmentalism
 Reactionary
 Technophilia
 Technostress
 Uncanny valley

References

Further reading
 Brosnan, M. (1998) Technophobia: The psychological impact of information technology. Routledge.
 Dan Dinello Technophobia: Science Fiction Visions of Posthuman Technology
"Environmental History Timeline." 20 July 2008.

External links